Solila is a town in Haute Matsiatra Region in central Madagascar. It is some 30 kilometres west of Fianarantsoa.

It lies at the Mananantanana river.

References

Populated places in Haute Matsiatra